Tumala Mountain is part of the Clackamas Foothills near Mount Hood in the U.S. state of Oregon. It is located in Mount Hood National Forest, near the city of Estacada.

In 2007, the Board on Geographic Names renamed the mountain, which was previously called Squaw Mountain, due to the word "squaw" being offensive. The word Tumala means "tomorrow" or "afterlife" in Chinook Wawa.

References

External links
 "Tumala Mountain Hike". Oregon Hikers.org.

Chinook Jargon place names
Geography of Clackamas County, Oregon
Mountains of Oregon